The Florida Atlantic Owls women's basketball team represents Florida Atlantic University in women's basketball. The school competes in Conference USA in Division I of the National Collegiate Athletic Association (NCAA). The Owls play home basketball games at FAU Arena in Boca Raton, Florida.

History
As of the end of the 2018–19 season, the Owls have an all-time record of 452–517 since beginning play in 1984. They have won one conference title and played in the NCAA Tournament (both in 2006). They played in the Atlantic Sun Conference from 1994 to 2006, the Sun Belt Conference from 2006 to 2013, and Conference USA since 2013.

Postseason

NCAA Division I tournament results
The Owls have made one appearance in the NCAA Division I women's basketball tournament. They have a combined record of 0–1.

NCAA Division II tournament results
The Owls made four appearances in the NCAA Division II women's basketball tournament. They had a combined record of 1–4.

References

External links